Sunil Kumar Sharma can refer to:
 Sunil Kumar Sharma (Jammu and Kashmir), Indian politician
 Sunil Kumar Sharma (Uttar Pradesh), Indian politician